António dos Santos (born 1876, date of death unknown) was a Portuguese sports shooter. He competed in five events at the 1920 Summer Olympics.

References

External links
 

1876 births
Year of death missing
Portuguese male sport shooters
Olympic shooters of Portugal
Shooters at the 1920 Summer Olympics
Place of birth missing